Muhyi Abdul-Hussein Mashhadi (1935 – 8 August 1979) was an Iraqi Ba'athist politician and leading member of the Arab Socialist Ba'ath Party in Iraq. He was a member of the Regional Command from 1974 to 1979, and the secretary of President Ahmed Hassan al-Bakr.

Ba'ath Party purge

On 16 July 1979, President Saddam Hussein announced that his government had foiled a conspiracy between members of the Iraqi Ba'ath party and the Syrian Ba'athist government against the Iraqi Ba'athist government. At an emergency meeting at al-Khild Hall in Baghdad, Saddam ordered Mashhadi to confess that he had conspired against the Iraqi government. Mashhadi identified 68 co-conspirators,
who were all led out of the hall and executed afterwards in August.

A special court was formed to try the 68 defendants, and Mashhadi's was announced among the executed on August 8, 1979.

Positions
 Member of the Central Workers' Bureau of the Ba'ath Party
 Minister of State without a ministry, 1974
 Member of the regional leadership of the Iraqi Arab Socialist Ba'ath Party, elected to the membership in 1977
 Member of the Revolutionary Command Council
 Secretary to President Ahmed Hassan al-Bakr. Saddam Hussein stated that Muhyiddin had been monitored since his work as a secretary to President Ahmed Hassan al-Bakr, and that Saddam Hussein did not order his arrest immediately after Ahmed Hassan al-Bakr's resignation.

References

Members of the Regional Command of the Arab Socialist Ba'ath Party – Iraq Region
People from Baghdad
Government ministers of Iraq
1935 births
1979 deaths